The 4th Legislative Assembly of Saskatchewan was elected in the Saskatchewan general election held in June 1917. The assembly sat from November 13, 1917, to May 16, 1921. The Liberal Party led by William Melville Martin formed the government. The Conservative Party of Saskatchewan led by Donald Maclean formed the official opposition. Wellington Willoughby had resigned from the assembly shortly after the election.

Robert Menzies Mitchell served as speaker for the assembly until May 1919. George Adam Scott succeeded Mitchell as speaker.

Members of the Assembly 
The following members were elected to the assembly in 1917:

Notes:

Party Standings 

Notes:

By-elections 
By-elections were held to replace members for various reasons:

Notes:

References 

Terms of the Saskatchewan Legislature